September Love is an East German film directed by Kurt Maetzig. It was released in 1961.

Plot
Leading chemist Hans Schramm is betrothed to Hanna, but falls in love with her younger sister Franka. The two attempt to repress their feelings, but eventually begin an affair. When Hans is extorted by a group of West German agents, who demand to know about his secret work, he is gripped by panic and decides the only way out is to flee to the West. Franka discovers his plans and informs the Stasi. Hans perceives it as betrayal at first, but after all ends well, he realizes she only wanted the best for him.

Cast
 Doris Abeßer - Franka
 Ulrich Thein - Dr. Hans Schramm
 Annekathrin Bürger - Hanna
 Hans Lucke  - Lieutenant Unger
 Kurt Dunkelmann - Priest Hübenthal
 Anna-Maria Besendahl -Hans' mother
 Micaëla Kreißler - Milli
 Heinz Laggies - Stasi agent
 Karl Heinz Oppel - Stasi agent

Production
While the Khrushchev Thaw allowed a considerable degree of liberalization in all Eastern Bloc countries, including in East Germany, the commitment of DEFA to follow the Socialist Unity Party of Germany's line was reaffirmed in the 1958 Bitterfeld Conference; although many pictures with less ideological restrictions were made at the time, the studio devoted much resources to produce films about the East-West German tensions. September Love was one of eight major works of this genre made between 1959 and 1964.

Maetzig told an interviewer that he was influenced by the sharpening political climate, on the eve of the erection of the Berlin Wall: "it became clear that a confrontation of some kind was brewing... We could not stand and watch... As events lurched toward a crisis".

The script was adapted from Herbert Otto's novel by the same name.

Reception
The film was a commercial success and received well by the audiences.

Peter Ulrich Weiss regarded September Love as a continuation of DEFA's long-established tradition of "Saboteur Thrillers", pitting the East German populace against a menace from the West. Antonin and Mira Liehm viewed it also as a forerunner of a new subgenre, aimed at rationalizing the building of the Wall, but using a new setting, mostly love stories, rather than plain political agitation. Heinz Kersten defined the film as "a completely incontroversial romance, that is remarkable for the unusual quality of the acting... but still propagates the old political message." Joshua Feinstein categorized September Love among the East German films focusing on the exploits of a single female protagonist, a theme that was popular with DEFA. Philip Broadbent and Sabine Hake noted that it was one of several pictures made during the early 1960s that "insisted on the unifying effect" that the closed border with the West had on ordinary people.

Also Known As
The song "September Love" by INOJ is a major production releasing June 8, 2018 worldwide. INOJ is a celebrity singer and songwriter best known for her debut single, "Love You Down", a cover of Ready for the World's 1986 hit that reached #25 in the United States. Her debut album was also named Ready for the World. INOJ released a cover version of Cyndi Lauper's "Time After Time" under Columbia Records in 1998, which was a Top 10 hit in the United States (#6), Canada (#7), and New Zealand (#10). In 1998, she released her debut album, Ready for the World. She also released a cover version of "Ring My Bell" as a single, though it did not receive much exposure.

References

External links
 
 September Love on PROGRESS' website.
 September Love on film-zeit.de.
 September Love original poster on ostfilm.de.
 September Love on DEFA Sternstunden.

1961 films
East German films
1960s German-language films
Films directed by Kurt Maetzig